The Chairman of the People's Khural of Kalmykia is the presiding officer of that legislature.

Chairmen of the Supreme Soviet

Chairman of the Temporary Parliament

Chairmen (Speakers) of the People's Khural of Kalmykia

Sources

Lists of legislative speakers in Russia
Chairmen